James Bates (November 16, 1952 – April 4, 2014) was an American organist and conductor, especially of Early music and Baroque music.

Born in Pittsburgh, Bates studied at the Susquehanna University and continued at the Yale School of Music where he focused on organ and choral conducting. He recorded several Bach cantatas with the ensemble Carolina Baroque. He served as an academic teacher at Salem College, Greensboro College, and Averett University.

References 

American conductors (music)
American male conductors (music)
1952 births
2014 deaths
Musicians from Pittsburgh
Susquehanna University alumni
Yale School of Music alumni
Classical musicians from Pennsylvania